Vihavu is a village in Elva Parish, Tartu County in Estonia.

References

Villages in Tartu County